Robert Donnelly (9 September 1908 – 3 June 1969) was a Scottish footballer who played as a centre half for Partick Thistle, Manchester City and Morton.

While with Partick, he was selected for a Scottish Football Association tour of North America in the summer of 1935; none of the matches was considered a full international. After moving to Manchester City a matter of days following his from tour as a replacement for Sam Cowan for a £5,000 transfer fee, he was a member of the squad when the Citizens won the Football League championship in 1936–37, albeit he made only five appearances during the campaign, with the more experienced Bobby Marshall moving back from an inside forward role to play in the heart of the defence.

References

1908 births
1969 deaths
Scottish footballers
Sportspeople from Wishaw
Association football central defenders
Greenock Morton F.C. players
Partick Thistle F.C. players
Manchester City F.C. players
Wishaw Juniors F.C. players
Scottish Junior Football Association players
Scottish Football League players
English Football League players
Footballers from North Lanarkshire